Radenko Pilčević (born December 15, 1986) is a Serbian professional basketball player for Čačak 94 of the Basketball League of Serbia. He can play both point guard and shooting guard positions.

Professional career
In December 2013, he signed with Radnički Kragujevac. He left them in February 2014. Later that month he moved to Hungary and signed with Szolnoki Olaj for the remainder of the season.

In August 2014, he signed with BCM U Pitești of the Romanian League. On November 27, 2014, he left Pitești. Three days later, he signed with BC Timișoara for the rest of the season.

On August 11, 2015, he signed with Lithuanian club BC Dzūkija. However, he left Dzūkija before appearing in a game for them. In October 2015, he signed with Metalac Valjevo. On December 3, 2015, he parted ways with Metalac after appearing in seven ABA league games.

On June 18, 2017, he signed with German club Science City Jena for the 2017–18 season. After only three games he left Jena and returned to his former club KB Košice. In 2018, he had a stint with Teodo Tivat. In August 2018, he signed for Lovćen 1947. 

In August 2021, he signed for Čačak 94 of the Second Basketball League of Serbia.

References

External links
Radenko Pilčević at aba-liga.com

Radenko Pilčević at eurocupbasketball.com
Radenko Pilčević at realgm.com

1986 births
Living people
ABA League players
Basketball League of Serbia players
CSU Pitești players
Giessen 46ers players
Guards (basketball)
KK Borac Čačak players
KK Bratunac players
KK Crnokosa players
KK Čačak 94 players
KK Lovćen players
KK Metalac Valjevo players
KK Proleter Zrenjanin players
KK Radnički Kragujevac (2009–2014) players
KK Teodo Tivat players
KK Železničar Čačak players
Mitteldeutscher BC players
People from Gornji Milanovac
SCM U Craiova (basketball) players
Serbian expatriate basketball people in Bosnia and Herzegovina
Serbian expatriate basketball people in Germany
Serbian expatriate basketball people in Hungary
Serbian expatriate basketball people in Montenegro
Serbian expatriate basketball people in North Macedonia
Serbian expatriate basketball people in Romania
Serbian expatriate basketball people in Slovakia
Serbian men's basketball players
Science City Jena players
Szolnoki Olaj KK players